is the French language equivalent of the stock phrase "Once upon a time".

Film and television 
 Once Upon a Time (1933 film), a French film
 Il était une fois..., a French educational animation franchise, created by Procidis. See Once Upon a Time...
 Il était une fois la Mésopotamie, a 1998 French documentary film by Jean-Claude Lubtchansky
 Il était une fois l’indépendance, a 2009 Malian film
 Il était une fois Sabrina et Manu, a short film by Jean Pierre Lefebvre
 Il était une fois dans l'oued, a 2005 film by Amina Annabi

 Literature 
 One of three sections in Bernard Werber's book Le miroir de Cassandre Il était une fois la Mésopotamie, an illustrated book by Jean Bottéro and Marie-Joseph Stève
 Il était une fois un enfant, a novel by Michel Tabachnik

 Music 
 Il était une fois (band), a French band featuring the lead vocals of Joëlle Mogensen
 Il était une fois, an album by band Il était une fois
 Il était une fois, a piece for voice and orchestra by André Caplet
 "Il était une fois nous deux", a song of Joe Dassin.

 Theater Il etait une fois'', a play by Francis de Croisset

See also
Det var en gång (disambiguation)
Once Upon a Time (disambiguation)